Aloys Fouda (born 1 May 2000) is a Cameroonian professional football player who plays for French club Châteauroux.

Club career 
Aloys Fouda made his professional debut for Caen on the 10 February 2021 starting as a right-back in the Coupe de France game against Paris Saint-Germain.

On 1 February 2022, Fouda joined Chambly on loan.

On 6 July 2022, Fouda moved to Châteauroux on a two-year contract.

References

External links
SM Caen profile
Ligue 2 profile

2000 births
Living people
People from Ebolowa
Cameroonian footballers
Association football defenders
Stade Malherbe Caen players
FC Chambly Oise players
LB Châteauroux players
Ligue 2 players
Championnat National players
Championnat National 2 players
Championnat National 3 players
Cameroonian expatriate footballers
Cameroonian expatriate sportspeople in France
Expatriate footballers in France